Mehmet Suvar (born 22 November 1946) is a Turkish weightlifter. He competed in the men's light heavyweight event at the 1976 Summer Olympics.

References

1946 births
Living people
Turkish male weightlifters
Olympic weightlifters of Turkey
Weightlifters at the 1976 Summer Olympics
Sportspeople from Adana
20th-century Turkish people